Boneh-ye Heydar (also Romanized as Boneh-ye Ḩeydar) is a village in Aghili-ye Shomali Rural District, Aghili District, Gotvand County, Khuzestan Province, Iran. At the 2006 census, its population was 447, in 84 families.

References 

Populated places in Gotvand County